Canestrelli ("little baskets") are a type of Italian biscuit. Originating in Monferrato, the biscuits are common in both Piedmont and Liguria. Moreover, under the name Canistrelli, they are also typical of Corsica.

See also
 Cujuelle

References

Bibliography

Cookies
Italian cuisine
Semolina dishes